Lucile Watson (May 27, 1879 – June 24, 1962) was a Canadian actress, long based in the United States. She was "famous for her roles of formidable dowagers."

Early years
Watson was born in Quebec and raised in Ottawa, the daughter of an officer in the British Army. Despite his wishes, she traveled to New York City and enrolled in a dramatic school.

Career

Watson began her career on the stage debuting on Broadway in the play Hearts Aflame in 1902. Her next play was The Girl with Green Eyes, the first of several Clyde Fitch stories. At the end of 1903, Watson appeared in Fitch's Glad of It. This play featured several young performers, including Watson who moved to major Broadway or motion picture prominence: Robert Warwick, John Barrymore, Thomas Meighan, and Grant Mitchell. For the rest of the decade, she appeared in several more Fitch stories into the 1910s. Fitch died in 1909.

Watson was primarily a stage actress, appearing in 39 Broadway plays. She starred in plays such as Captain Jinks of the Horse Marines, Heartbreak House, Ghosts, The Importance of Being Earnest, and Pride and Prejudice.

Watson's first film role was in the 1916 silent film The Girl with Green Eyes, a film version of the Clyde Fitch play she had performed on Broadway in 1902. She did not appear in another movie until 1930 when she had an uncredited role in The Royal Family of Broadway. In 1939, she played a memorable role as Norma Shearer's wise mother in the cultural comedy/drama from the Clare Booth Luce play The Women.

Watson reached the height of her adult acting career in playwright Lillian Hellman's anti-fascist dramatic stage play Watch on the Rhine on Broadway in 1941, starring Paul Lukas. Two years later in Hollywood, she and Lukas reprised their roles in the film adaptation. In perhaps her best known film role, Lucile Watson's performance as Fanny Farrelly received a nomination for the Academy Award for Best Supporting Actress.

Lucile Watson played Aunt March in the 1949 film version of Little Women, whose stars included Elizabeth Taylor as Amy. The following year, she was cast along with her famous The Women co-star Joan Crawford in the melodrama Harriet Craig.

Death
Watson died on June 25, 1962.

Broadway roles
 No More Ladies (1934) as Mrs. Fanny Townsend
 Watch on the Rhine (1941) as Fanny Farrelly

Partial filmography

 The Royal Family of Broadway (1930) as Actress Backstage (uncredited)
 What Every Woman Knows (1934) as La Contessa la Brierre 
 The Bishop Misbehaves (1935) as Lady Emily
 The Garden of Allah (1936) as Mother Superior Josephine
 A Woman Rebels (1936) as Betty Bumble
 Three Smart Girls (1936) as Martha
 The Young in Heart (1938) as Mrs. Jennings
 Sweethearts (1938) as Mrs. Marlowe
 Made for Each Other (1939) as Mrs. Harriet Mason
 The Women (1939) as Mrs. Morehead
 Waterloo Bridge (1940) as Lady Margaret Cronin
 Florian (1940) as Countess
 Mr. & Mrs. Smith (1941) as Mrs. Custer
 Rage in Heaven (1941) as Mrs. Monrell
 Footsteps in the Dark (1941) as Mrs. Archer
 The Great Lie (1941) as Aunt Ada
 Model Wife (1941) as J.J. Benson
 Watch on the Rhine (1943) as Fanny Farrelly
 Uncertain Glory (1944) as Mme. Maret
 Till We Meet Again (1944) as Mother Superior
 The Thin Man Goes Home (1945) as Mrs. Charles
 Tomorrow Is Forever (1946) as Aunt Jessica Hamilton
 My Reputation (1946) as Mrs. Mary Kimball
 Never Say Goodbye (1946) as Mrs. Hamilton
 Song of the South (1946) as Grandmother
 The Razor's Edge (1946) as Louisa Bradley
 Ivy (1947) as Mrs. Gretorex
 The Emperor Waltz (1948) as Princess Bitotska
 Julia Misbehaves (1948) as Mrs. Packett
 That Wonderful Urge (1948) as Aunt Cornelia Farley
 Little Women (1949) as Aunt March
 Everybody Does It (1949) as Mrs. Blair
 Let's Dance (1950) as Serena Everett
 Harriet Craig (1950) as Celia Fenwick
 My Forbidden Past (1951) as Aunt Eula Beaurevel

Sources
 Lucile Watson biography by Film historian T. R. Bourgeois

References

Further reading

External links

Lucile Watson portraits Broadway 1910s or 20s NYP Library

Lucile Watson posing for Vanity Fair August 1921 portrait by Nickolas Muray
Lucile Watson - Aveleyman

1879 births
1962 deaths
Actresses from New York City
Actresses from Quebec City
Canadian film actresses
Canadian television actresses
Canadian stage actresses
Canadian expatriate actresses in the United States
20th-century American actresses